Janice Hallett (born 1969) is a British journalist, screenwriter, and author of mystery novels. Her debut, The Appeal is UK's second bestselling fiction debut of 2021.

She studied screenwriting at the Royal Holloway, University of London and English language at the University College London. In 2011, she co-wrote Retreat, a 2011 British horror-thriller film. She worked as a journalist for the Department for International Development. She also worked at Cosmetics International.

Janice's 2022 book, The Twyford Code was listed as one of the "Best books of 2022: Crime fiction" by Financial Times.

Bibliography

The Appeal (2021)
The Twyford Code (2022)
The Mysterious Case of the Alperton Angels (2023)
The Christmas Appeal (2023)
The Examiner (2024)

References

21st-century British screenwriters
1969 births
Living people
21st-century British novelists
21st-century British journalists
British women journalists
British women novelists
British women screenwriters
Alumni of Royal Holloway, University of London
Alumni of University College London
Place of birth missing (living people)